Shake Your Pelvis is a 2000 album released by the Red Elvises.

Track listing 
Everybody Disco (Igor)
Beat of a Drum (Zhenya)
Girl from Malibu (Zhenya)
200 Lbs Of Pure Love (Igor)
Girls Gonna Boogie Tonight (Zhenya)
We Got the Groove (Igor)
Heroic Interlude
Rocketship (Zhenya)
Colors of Rainbow (Igor)
Techno Surfer (Zhenya)
City of Angels (lyrics by John Montobello/ music by Igor and Oleg)
Cosmic Surf (Zhenya)
Romantic Interlude
Good Guys (Igor)

Credits 
Igor: vocals, guitars, bass
Zhenya: vocals, guitars, guitar synth, harmonica, violin, piano, bass, digital editing
Oleg: vocals, bass, keyboard, percussion, programming, digital editing
Avi: vocals, drums, percussion, cheerful spirit

Guest Performers:
Dianne Sellers - vocal
Letitia Jones - vocal
Shana Halligan - vocal
Galina Shlimovich - violin
Oleg "Schramm" Gorbunov - Hammond organ
Dmitry Mamokhin - trumpet
ххeo Chelyapov - saxophone
Jay Work - saxophones
Vladimir Tchekan - trombone
Iouri Ionidi - guitar

Recorded  at Shooba-Doobah Studios, Venice, CA   November 1999 - January 2000
Engineers: Doctor Z and Professor O.
Mixed at Shooba-Doobah Studios
Engineers: Barry Connely, Jeff King, Doctor Z and Professor O.
Mastered at Paramount Recording Studios by King himself
Photography by Tanya Thuringer
Design and layout by Christy A. Moeller-Masel
Avi Sills plays DW (Oleg's first car was VW)

Red Elvises albums
2000 albums